Martin Flämig (19 August 1913, in Aue – 13 January 1998, in Dresden) was a German church musician, and the cantor of the Dresdner Kreuzchor from 1971 to 1991.

Biography 
Martin Flämig studied since 1934 in Dresden with Alfred Stier and in Leipzig at the Kirchenmusikalisches Institut des Leipziger Konservatoriums with Karl Straube, Günther Ramin, and Johann Nepomuk David. He was since 1948 cantor at the Versöhnungskirche in Dresden and premiered there Willy Burkhard's oratorio Das Gesicht des Jesaja (The Vision of Isaiah), Ernst Krenek's Lamentationes Jeremiae Prophetae and Johannes Drießler's Dein Reich komme.

In 1953 he was appointed professor of the Hochschule für Musik Dresden. He was a teacher at the Bern Conservatory since 1959. In 1971 he was appointed Dresdner Kreuzkantor as the successor of Rudolf Mauersberger and held the post until 1991.

References 

German choral conductors
German male conductors (music)
Academic staff of the Hochschule für Musik Carl Maria von Weber
1913 births
1998 deaths
20th-century German conductors (music)
20th-century German male musicians